The  is an annual marathon road running event for men and women over the classic distance of 42.195 kilometres which is held in mid March in the city of Yokohama, Japan.

References

External links
 

Recurring sporting events established in 1981
Marathons in Japan
Sport in Yokohama